Sarojini Pillay is a Fijian academic of Indian descent.  In the second week of February 2006, Pillay, a former Registrar of the University of the South Pacific (USP), was appointed as the first Registrar of the newly founded University of Fiji, scheduled to take up her duties on 13 March.

Pillay is a graduate of the Central Michigan University in the United States, the University of Madras in India, and the Fiji School of Agriculture.  She first became Registrar of the USP in 1991, and after her retirement from this position she was approached by the new university to be its first Registrar.

Sources 
 Fiji Sun

Central Michigan University alumni
Pillay, Sarojini
Living people
Fijian Tamils
Academic staff of the University of the South Pacific
University of Madras alumni
Women academic administrators
Indian academic administrators
Fijian women
Fijian women academics
Fijian academic administrators
21st-century Fijian educators
Year of birth missing (living people)
21st-century women educators